Deuri may refer to:

Deuri, Nepal, a village in Sagarmatha Zone, Nepal
Deori people, a tribe from northeast India, mainly found in Assam
Deori language, spoken by them
Deuri (Illyrian tribe), an ancient Illyrian tribe

See also 
 Deori (disambiguation)